Kanha may refer to:

 Krishna, a Hindu deity
 Kanha (Satavahana dynasty), 1st century BCE Indian king
 Kanha (poet), Indian poet
 Kanha (film), a 2016 Marathi language action drama film
 Kanha National Park in Madhya Pradesh, India
 Kanha (song), 2017 Hindi song 
 Kanha, a village in the Jintur taluka of Parbhani district in Maharashtra, India
 Kanha, a village in Madhya Pradesh, India
 Kahna, village in Kapurthala, Punjab, India
 Kahna Nau, town in Lahore, Punjab, Pakistan